Endohelea is a proposed clade of eukaryotes that are related to Archaeplastida and the SAR supergroup. They used to be considered heliozoans, but phylogenetically they belong to a group of microorganisms known as Cryptista.

Classification
Based on studies done by Cavalier-Smith, Chao & Lewis in 2015, the class contained two orders: Microhelida and Heliomonadida. However, according to a study by Cavalier-Smith, published in 2022, the order Heliomonadida is actually part of Cercozoa, and only one species of heliomonad, Tetrahelia pterbica, has been kept in Endohelea as its own order Axomonadida.
 Class Endohelea Cavalier-Smith 2012
 Order Microhelida Cavalier-Smith 2011
 Family Microheliellidae Cavalier-Smith 2011
 Genus Microheliella Cavalier-Smith & Chao 2012
 Order Axomonadida 
 Family Tetraheliidae 
 Genus Tetrahelia 
? Order Heliomonadida Cavalier-Smith 1993 emend. Cavalier-Smith 2012
? Family Heliomorphidae Cavalier-Smith & Bass 2009
? Genus Heliomorpha Cavalier-Smith & Bass 2009

References

External links

 Tree of Life: Hacrobia

Cryptista
Taxa named by Thomas Cavalier-Smith
Bikont classes